Erik Pär Zetterberg (born 16 February 1997) is a Swedish professional footballer who plays as a midfielder for Lindome GIF.

Club career

Early career
Zetterberg began his career in the youth setup of Belgian side Royal Stade Brainois, the same club where Eden and Thorgan Hazard developed.

Falkenbergs FF
Zetterberg signed his first professional contract with Allsvenskan side Falkenbergs FF in June 2015 after coming through the club's youth system. On 21 February 2016, he made his senior debut in the Svenska Cupen in a 2–0 win over Tenhults IF. He made his league debut on 30 October 2016 in a 4–1 loss to Helsingborg. Zetterberg went on to make two league appearances in total that season.

Zetterberg failed to make a first-team appearance in the 2017 season in the Superettan. The following year, he made six league appearances for Falkenbergs FF before departing mid-season.

Varbergs BoIS
On 10 July 2018, Zetterberg signed for Superettan side Varbergs BoIS. He made five league appearances for Varberg that season and one appearance each in the league and Svenska Cupen in 2019. On 30 August 2019, Zetterberg was sent on loan to Ettan side Tvååkers IF, where he made eight aappearances before the end of the season.

FC Edmonton
On 5 February 2020, Zetterberg signed with Canadian Premier League side FC Edmonton. He made his debut for the Eddies on August 16 against Forge FC.

Lindome GIF
On 22 March 2021, Zetterberg returned to Sweden, signing with Ettan side Lindome GIF.

Personal life
Zetterberg is the son of former Swedish international footballer Pär Zetterberg. He was born in Belgium.

Career statistics
.

References

External links

1997 births
Living people
Association football midfielders
Swedish footballers
Swedish expatriate footballers
Expatriate footballers in Belgium
Swedish expatriate sportspeople in Belgium
Expatriate soccer players in Canada
Swedish expatriate sportspeople in Canada
Falkenbergs FF players
Varbergs BoIS players
Tvååkers IF players
FC Edmonton players
Allsvenskan players
Superettan players
Ettan Fotboll players
Canadian Premier League players